Kanishka Soni (born 16 August 1987) is an Indian actress and model from Mumbai. She has an MBA in finance from the University of Mumbai. After her studies she was selected for singing in the reality show bathroom singer on Filmy Tv by Optimystix Entertainment. She is best known for her character Daisa's bahu in the Star Plus Tv show Diya Aur Baati Hum, Manjari Satya Nayak in the Life Ok Television series Do Dil Ek Jaan opposite Akshay Dogra, Sati's sister Revati in Devon Ke Dev...Mahadev on Life Ok, Parashavi (Vidur's Wife) in the Star Plus TV soap opera Mahabharat, Maya Thakur in Begusarai (TV series) on &TV, Sumitra in Sankatmochan Mahabali Hanumaan on Sony Entertainment Television, Inspector Redkar in the most popular show on star plus Kullfi Kumarr Bajewala. Currently she is seen as Devi River Ganga in Devi Adi Parashakti on Dangal TV. She is a Politician with Ramdas Athawale's political party.

Early life
Soni was born on 16 August 1989 in Ahmedabad in the Indian state of Gujarat. She completed her schooling from Kendriya Vidyalaya, Shahibaug and Masters and Post Graduation in diploma in finance from University of Mumbai.

Career
Soni started her career in 2007 when she got selected for a singing reality show Bathroom singer on Filmy Tv by Optimystix Entertainment Pvt. Ltd. after completing her studies. Although her career started as a singer, she was more passionate towards acting. Initially she got an opportunity as a model to accompany Akshay Kumar in Grand Finale of Fear Factor Khatron Ke Khiladi Level 2 and with VJ Juhi in Exhausted on Channel V both by Endemol India Pvt. Ltd.. She made her debut in a Tamil movie Pathayeram Kodi opposite to Vivek in 2013. She has appeared in multiple movies, such as Pathaayiram Kodi, Devaraya and Yuvrajayam. She has played various roles in TV shows as Manjari Satya Nayak in the television series Do Dil Ek Jaan on Life OK Tv channel opposite Akshay Dogra and Pavitra Rishta on Zee Tv as Sukruti. She was paired opposite to Hasan Zaidi in Channel V show Gumrah: End of Innocence, season 3. Currently she is doing Diya Aur Baati Hum on Star Plus as Daisa's Bahu and Devon Ke Dev...Mahadev on Life Ok Tv channel as Princess Raveti. She has been acted in commercial advertisement of Huggies diaper, Shriram cement, Slicer and Dicer Tele, and corporate advertising and promos for N.D.T.V. Imagine shows, promo for Channel V show Yeh Jawani Ta Ra Ri Ri and been model for brands like LIC, Provo Glasses and JULIET Punjabi dresses. She has played various roles in Tv shows as such CID, Crime Patrol and Shapath. Soni played the role of Saraswati Devi and Mata Parvati in an air show Sankatmorchan Hanumaan on DD National. She has appeared in various live show events with singers Anup Jalota and Ram shankar. She has also sung songs for DD National Show Sankatmorchan Hanumaan and for music composer Nikhil Kamath.

Soni has signed to act in the show MTV Webbed-Cyber Abuse (Season 2) hosted by Kritika Kamra on MTV along with Do Dil Ek Jaan co-actor Nikita Sharma by Balaji Telefilms and is said to act in Gumrah: End of Innocence, season 4 and &TV's Tujhse Naraz Nahi Zindagi.

Soni has got her first break as a playback singer for upcoming movie M A PASS which is by the same makers of 2014 released B.A. Pass starer Shilpa Shukla which claimed many national and international awards, The song is composed by Geet Vani, recreated by Dhiren Raichura and mixing by Sajan patel who are very known and experienced people from the industry. while experiencing herself phase of struggle into music industry, she has registered her own company KASO MUZIK which can make easy access for singers from outside world to enter into Bollywood industry

Recognition
 2007: As a singer, She won a contest on DD National show Close Up Music Masti Aur Dhoom, and a game/quiz show by Indian Television Academy, hosted by Anu Kapoor in 2007.
 2015 : Gorwanta Gujarati award, for contribution in the Indian Entertainment industry.
2015 : Due to her acting, modelling and singing achievements she has been declared by The Times of India multi talented beauty.
2016 : Soni was recognised for her social activities for supporting "save girl child" and associating herself with RESCUE FOUNDATION owned by Triveni Acharya

Television and filmography

References

External links
 
 

Living people
Indian television actresses
Indian soap opera actresses
1987 births
Gujarati people
Actresses from Ahmedabad
Actresses in Tamil cinema
21st-century Indian actresses